Wuttidet Lukprabat, is a Thai Muay Thai fighter and wushu practitioner. In 2007 Wuttidet was elected Fighter of the year by multiple authorities. The next year his gym the Lukprabat camp won the award for gym of the year.

Titles and accomplishments 
 Professional Boxing Association of Thailand (PAT) 
 2008 Thailand 122 lbs Champion
 Omnoi Stadium
 2006 Omnoi Stadium 118 lbs Champion

Awards
 2007 Lumpinee Stadium Fighter of the Year
 2007 Sports Writers Association of Thailand Fighter of the Year
 2007 Siam Sports Fighter of the Year

Fight record 

|-  style="background:#fbb;"
| 2011-09-11|| Loss ||align=left| Genji Umeno || M-1 FAIRTEX Muay Thai Challenge RAORAK　MUAY vol.3  || Tokyo, Japan || KO (Right Elbow)|| 4 || 2:23

|-  style="text-align:center; background:#fbb;"
| 2011-07-08 || Loss ||align=left| Lekkla Thanasuranakorn || Lumpinee Stadium || Bangkok, Thailand || KO || 2||

|-  style="text-align:center; background:#cfc;"
| 2011-06-09 || Win ||align=left| Lekkla Thanasuranakorn || Rajadamnern Stadium || Bangkok, Thailand || Decision ||5 ||3:00

|-  style="background:#fbb;"
| 2010-08-10 || Loss ||align=left| Pettawee Sor Kittichai || Petchpiya + Jor.Por.Ror.7, Lumpinee Stadium || Bangkok, Thailand || Decision || 5 || 3:00

|-  style="background:#cfc;"
| 2010-07-13 || Win ||align=left| F-16 Rachanon || Ruamnamjai Wongkarnmuay Fight, Lumpinee Stadium || Bangkok, Thailand || Decision || 5 || 3:00

|-  style="background:#fbb;"
| 2009-10-12 || Loss ||align=left| Anuwat Kaewsamrit || Muaythai Open 9: Road to Real King XIII || Japan || KO (Right punch) || 3 ||

|-  style="background:#fbb;"
| 2009-09-04 || Loss ||align=left| Sam-A Gaiyanghadao || Lumpinee Stadium || Bangkok, Thailand || Decision || 5 || 3:00
|-
! style=background:white colspan=9 |

|-  style="background:#fbb;"
| 2009-07-03 || Loss ||align=left| Pornsanae Sitmonchai || Lumpinee Stadium || Bangkok, Thailand || TKO || 2 ||

|-  style="text-align:center; background:#fbb;"
| 2009-02-06 || Loss ||align=left| Petchboonchu FA Group || Lumpinee Stadium || Bangkok, Thailand || Decision || 5 || 3:00

|-  style="background:#cfc;"
| 2009-01-18 || Win||align=left| Shinichiro Ono || Muaylok Japan 2009 - Saidai Saikyou no Muay Thai Matsuri|| Tokyo, Japan || Decision (Unanimous) || 5 || 3:00

|-  style="background:#fbb;"
| 2008-12-09 || Loss||align=left| Nong-O Gaiyanghadao || Lumpinee Champion Krikkrai Fight || Bangkok, Thailand || Decision || 5 || 3:00

|-  style="background:#cfc;"
| 2008-10-31 || Win ||align=left| Kanchai Fairtex || Kriekrai Fights, Lumpinee Stadium || Bangkok, Thailand || Decision || 5 ||3:00

|-  style="text-align:center; background:#cfc;"
| 2008-09-30 || Win||align=left| Petchboonchu FA Group|| Lumpinee Stadium || Bangkok, Thailand || Decision || 5 || 3:00

|-  style="background:#cfc;"
| 2008-09-04 || Win ||align=left| Nong-O Gaiyanghadao || Daorungprabath Fights, Rajadamnern Stadium || Bangkok, Thailand || TKO || 4 ||

|- style="background:#fbb;"
| 2008-08-08 || Loss ||align=left| Saenchai Sor Kingstar || Kriekrai Fights, Lumpinee Stadium || Bangkok, Thailand || Decision || 5 || 3:00

|- style="background:#cfc;"
| 2008-07-04 || Win ||align=left| Saenchai Sor Kingstar || Kriekrai Fights, Lumpinee Stadium || Bangkok, Thailand || Decision || 5 || 3:00

|- style="background:#cfc;"
| 2008-06-04 || Win ||align=left| Kanchai Fairtex|| Sor.Sommai, Rajadamnern Stadium || Bangkok, Thailand || TKO || 3 ||

|- style="background:#cfc;"
| 2008-05-02 || Win ||align=left| Denkiri Sor.Sommai || Kriekrai Fights, Lumpinee Stadium || Bangkok, Thailand || TKO || 3 ||

|-  style="background:#c5d2ea;"
| 2008-03-28 || Draw ||align=left| Detnarong Wor.Sangprapai ||Lumpinee Stadium || Bangkok, Thailand || Decision || 5 || 3:00
|-
! style=background:white colspan=9 |

|-  style="background:#cfc;"
| 2008-02-05 || Win ||align=left| Sam-A Gaiyanghadao || Lumpinee Stadium || Bangkok, Thailand || Decision || 5 || 3:00

|-  style="background:#cfc;"
| 2007-12-|| Win ||align=left| Detnarong Wor.Sangprapai  ||  Lumpinee Stadium || Bangkok, Thailand || Decision || 5 || 3:00

|-  style="background:#cfc;"
| 2007-11-06 || Win ||align=left| Detnarong Wor.Sangprapai  || Petchpiya, Lumpinee Stadium || Bangkok, Thailand || Decision || 5 || 3:00

|-  style="background:#cfc;"
| 2007-10- || Win ||align=left| Captainken Naruepai || Rajadamnern Stadium || Bangkok, Thailand || Decision || 5 || 3:00

|-  style="background:#fbb;"
| 2007-09- || Loss||align=left| Detnarong Wor.Sangprapai  || Lumpinee Stadium || Bangkok, Thailand || Decision || 5 || 3:00

|-  style="background:#cfc;"
| 2007-08-17 || Win ||align=left| Fahmeechai F.A.Group  || Wanboonya, Lumpinee Stadium || Bangkok, Thailand || Decision || 5 || 3:00

|-  style="background:#cfc;"
| 2007-07-03 || Win ||align=left| Mongkonchai Phetsupaphan  ||  Phetchpiya, Lumpinee Stadium || Bangkok, Thailand || Decision || 5 || 3:00

|-  style="background:#c5d2ea;"
| 2007-05-18 || Draw||align=left| Captainken Naruepai  || Lumpinee Stadium || Bangkok, Thailand || Decision || 5 || 3:00

|-  style="background:#cfc;"
| 2007-04-13 || Win ||align=left| Rittidet Sombatcharoen || Lumpinee Stadium || Bangkok, Thailand || KO || 3 ||

|-  style="background:#cfc;"
| 2007-03-06 || Win ||align=left| Mongkonchai Phetsupaphan  ||  Wanboonya, Lumpinee Stadium || Bangkok, Thailand || Decision || 5 || 3:00

|-  style="background:#cfc;"
| 2007-02-13 || Win ||align=left| Chalermdet Infinity || Lumpinee Stadium || Bangkok, Thailand || Decision || 5 || 3:00

|- style="background:#c5d2ea;"
| 2007-01-10 || Draw ||align=left| Denkiri Sor.Sommai || Rajadamnern Stadium || Bangkok, Thailand || Decision || 5 ||3:00

|-  style="background:#cfc;"
| 2006-10-06 || Win ||align=left| Pinsiam Sor.Amnuaysirichoke ||  Eminentair, Lumpinee Stadium || Bangkok, Thailand || Decision || 5 || 3:00

|- style="background:#fbb;"
| 2006-09-07 || Loss ||align=left| Denkiri Sor.Sommai || Rajadamnern Stadium || Bangkok, Thailand || Decision || 5 ||3:00

|-  style="background:#fbb;"
| 2006-07-21 || Loss||align=left| Nong-O Gaiyanghadao|| Wanboonya Fights, Lumpinee Stadium || Bangkok, Thailand || TKO || 2 ||

|-  style="background:#fbb;"
| 2006-05-02 || Loss||align=left| Petchmanee Petsupapan || Petsupapan, Lumpinee Stadium || Bangkok, Thailand || Decision || 5 ||3:00

|-  style="background:#c5d2ea;"
| 2006-03-31 || Draw ||align=left| Nong-O Gaiyanghadao || Lumpinee Stadium || Bangkok, Thailand || Decision || 5 || 3:00

|-  style="background:#fbb;"
| 2006-01-31 || Loss||align=left| Chalermdet Sor.Tawanrung  || Wanboonya Fights, Lumpinee Stadium || Bangkok, Thailand || Decision || 5 || 3:00

|-  style="background:#fbb;"
| 2005-12-02 || Loss||align=left| Captainken Naruepai  || Lumpinee Stadium || Bangkok, Thailand || Decision || 5 || 3:00

|-  style="background:#cfc;"
| 2005-10-24 || Win ||align=left| Pinsiam Sor.Amnuaysirichoke ||  || Phetchaburi Province, Thailand || Decision || 5 || 3:00

|-  style="background:#cfc;"
| 2005-09-22 || Win ||align=left| Phet-Ek Kiatyongyut || OneSongchai, Rajadamnern Stadium || Bangkok, Thailand || Decision || 5 || 3:00

|-  style="background:#cfc;"
| 2005-08-19 || Win ||align=left| Sarawut Lukbanyai || Petchsupapan, Lumpinee Stadium || Bangkok, Thailand || Decision || 5 || 3:00

|-  style="background:#fbb;"
| 2005-02-28 || Loss ||align=left| Anuwat Kaewsamrit || Daorungprabath Fights, Rajadamnern Stadium || Bangkok, Thailand || Decision || 5 || 3:00

|-  style="background:#cfc;"
| 2005-01-11 || Win ||align=left| Sueahuallek Chor.Sopipong || Lumpinee Stadium || Bangkok, Thailand || Decision || 5 || 3:00

|-  style="background:#c5d2ea;"
| 2004-11-02 || Draw ||align=left| Pinsiam Sor.Amnuaysirichoke || Lumpinee Stadium || Bangkok, Thailand || Decision || 5 || 3:00

|-  style="background:#cfc;"
| 2004-10-11 || Win ||align=left| Wanmeechai Meenayothin || Rajadamnern Stadium || Bangkok, Thailand || Decision  || 5 || 3:00

|-  style="background:#cfc;"
| 2004-09-02 || Win ||align=left| Ronnachai Naratreekul ||  Onesongchai, Rajadamnern Stadium || Bangkok, Thailand || Decision || 5 || 3:00

|-  style="background:#fbb;"
| 2004-07-13 || Loss ||align=left| Ngatao Atharungroj|| Petchsupapan, Lumpinee Stadium || Bangkok, Thailand || Decision || 5 || 3:00

|-  style="background:#cfc;"
| 2004-06-11 || Win ||align=left| Phet-Ek Sitjawai || Kiatpetch, Lumpinee Stadium || Bangkok, Thailand || Decision || 5 || 3:00

|-  style="background:#cfc;"
| 2004-04-21 || Win ||align=left| Sam-A Gaiyanghadao || Rajadamnern Stadium || Bangkok, Thailand || Decision || 5 || 3:00

|-  style="background:#fbb;"
| 2004-02-12 || Loss||align=left| Wanmeechai Meenayothin || Rajadamnern Stadium || Bangkok, Thailand || Decision  || 5 || 3:00

|-  style="background:#cfc;"
| 2003-11-14 || Win ||align=left| Kaew Fairtex ||  World Boxing WBC, Lumpinee Stadium || Bangkok, Thailand || Decision  || 5 || 3:00

|-  style="background:#cfc;"
| 2003-09-21 || Win ||align=left| Orono Sor.Sakulphan || OneSonghcai, Rajadamnern Stadium || Bangkok, Thailand || Decision || 5 || 3:00

|-  style="background:#cfc;"
| 2003-08-31 || Win ||align=left| Pongsing Kiatchansing || Rajadamnern Stadium || Bangkok, Thailand || Decision || 5 || 3:00

|-  style="background:#cfc;"
| 2003-07-10 || Win ||align=left| Kornphet Petchrachabat || Rajadamnern Stadium || Bangkok, Thailand || Decision || 5 || 3:00

|-  style="background:#;"
| 2003-02-26 ||  ||align=left| Sayannoi Kiatpraphat || Rajadamnern Stadium || Bangkok, Thailand || ||  ||

|-  style="background:#cfc;"
| 2002-10-09 || Win ||align=left| Ronnachai Naratreekul ||  Wansongchai + Palangnum, Rajadamnern Stadium || Bangkok, Thailand || Decision ||5  ||3:00

|-  style="background:#;"
| 2002-09-09 ||  ||align=left| Thongchai Tor.Silachai || Rajadamnern Stadium || Bangkok, Thailand || Decision || 5 || 3:00

|-  style="background:#cfc;"
| 2002-07-09 || Win ||align=left| Monmeechai Meenayothin || Petchsupapan, Lumpinee Stadium || Bangkok, Thailand || Decision  || 5 || 3:00

|-  style="background:#fbb;"
| 2002-04-22 || Loss ||align=left| Puja Sor.Suwanee || || Bangkok, Thailand || Decision  || 5 || 3:00

|-  style="background:#fbb;"
| 2002-03-20 || Loss ||align=left| Bovy Sor Udomson || Rajadamnern Stadium|| Bangkok, Thailand || Decision  || 5 || 3:00

|-  style="background:#cfc;"
| 2001-07-14 || Win ||align=left| Vesaknoi Kiatpraphat ||  Daorungprabath, Lumpinee Stadium || Bangkok, Thailand || Decision  || 5 || 3:00

|-  style="background:#cfc;"
| 2001-05-22 || Win ||align=left| Yodradab Kiatpayathai || Lumpinee Stadium || Bangkok, Thailand || Decision  || 5 || 3:00

|-  style="background:#cfc;"
| 2000-12-16 || Win ||align=left| Rungjarat Pichitmarn ||  Omnoi Stadium ||Samut Sakhon, Thailand || TKO || 3 || 

|-  style="background:#cfc;"
| 2000-11-18 || Win ||align=left| Namphet Chor.Ketratanakul ||  Omnoi Stadium ||Samut Sakhon, Thailand || Decision || 5 || 3:00

|-  style="background:#cfc;"
| 2000-10-28 || Win ||align=left| Leonard Jirapat5 ||  Omnoi Stadium ||Samut Sakhon, Thailand || Decision || 5 || 3:00

|-  style="background:#cfc;"
| 2000-08-24 || Win ||align=left| Sitrak Asavayothin|| Lumpinee Stadium || Bangkok, Thailand || Decision  || 5 || 3:00

|-  style="background:#fbb;"
| 2000-05-26 || Loss ||align=left| Phet-Ek Sitjaopho || Rajadamnern Stadium || Bangkok, Thailand || TKO (Elbow) || 4 ||

|-  style="background:#fbb;"
| 2000-03-07 || Loss ||align=left| Muangsamut Luksamut|| Lumpinee Stadium || Bangkok, Thailand || Decision  || 5 || 3:00

|-  style="background:#cfc;"
| 1999- || Win ||align=left| Rungjarat Phichitmarn || Omnoi Stadium ||Samut Sakhon, Thailand || KO || 3 ||

|-  style="background:#fbb;"
| 1999-09-25 || Loss||align=left| Petchchawang Asvayothin || Omnoi Stadium ||Samut Sakhon, Thailand || Decision || 5 || 3:00

|-  style="background:#cfc;"
| 1999-06-24 || Win ||align=left| Prasertchai Sor.Sakulwong ||   Lumpinee Stadium ||Bangkok, Thailand || Decision || 5 || 3:00

|-  style="background:#cfc;"
| 1999-04-19 || Win ||align=left| Morakotdaeng Sitsei ||   ||Bangkok, Thailand || Decision || 5 || 3:00

|-  style="background:#;"
| 1999-01-07 || ||align=left| Pokaew Fonjangchonburi ||   || Thailand || ||  ||

|-  style="background:#fbb;"
| 1998-04-18 || Loss||align=left| Pokaew Fonjangchonburi ||  Omnoi Stadium ||Samut Sakhon, Thailand || Decision || 5 || 3:00
|-
| colspan=9 | Legend:

References 

Wuttidet Lukprabat
Living people
1986 births
Southeast Asian Games medalists in wushu
Wuttidet Lukprabat
Wuttidet Lukprabat